Awful Mess Mystery is the debut album by indie rock band Wolfie, released in 1998 via Mud Records.  In a 2005 article on indie pop, Pitchfork Media's Nitsuh Abebe referred to it as "an insanely good record that hardly anyone likes" and "one of the best albums of the nineties."

Track listing 
 "I Know I Know I Know"
 "Mockhouse"
 "Hey It's Finally Yay"
 "Yeah Yeah You"
 "Subroutine The Reward"
 "Ikat Me"
 "Lazy Weekend, Stormy Season"
 "Getting The Reach That I Need"
 "Live Saver Socks"
 "Everybody Ought To Know"
 "I Gotta, U Gotta"
 "Iron Orange, Iron Blue"
 "Want To Practice (You Do)"

References 

1998 albums
Wolfie albums